The Karaivetti Bird Sanctuary is a  protected area located in the Ariyalur District of the state of Tamil Nadu, India. This freshwater lake is fed by Pullambadi, Kattalal canal and attracts thousands of birds every year. This lake was declared as a sanctuary in 1999 by the Government of Tamil Nadu. About 200 birds are species recorded from this sanctuary. Karaivetti Bird Sanctuary is one of the Important Bird Areas (IBA's) of Tamil Nadu (Code No. IN268, Criteria: A1, A4i, A4iii).

Karaivetti Bird Sanctuary is home to migratory birds such as Bar-headed goose, Northern pintail, White Stork, Northern shoveler, Garganey, Blue-winged teal, Osprey and common sandpiper

The sanctuary is a large irrigation tank located in the northern alluvial plains of the Kaveri river. It is fed during the northeast monsoons by the Pullambadi canal. It is also referred to together with another nearby tank and called Vettakudi-Karaivetti Bird Sanctuary. Farm lands especially paddy, sugarcane, cotton, castor and maize are surrounded by this lake and irrigated from this lake. Acacia nilotica planted inside the lake is serving as a major nesting site for birds.

During winter, the total number of birds recorded is between 20,000 and 60,000, mostly Anatidae. Globally threatened species such as Greater Spotted Eagle, Oriental Darter, Black-headed ibis and Spot-billed Pelican were reported in this site  
Karaivetti is one of the important active heronries in Tamil Nadu. Spot-billed Pelican, Black-headed ibis, Painted Stork, Oriental Darter, Eurasian Spoonbill are some of the birds species breeding in this sanctuary

Other fauna inhabit this region are Golden Jackal, Black-naped hare, Indian grey mongoose and nearly 15 species of fish were reported 
Karaivetti Bird Sanctuary attracts birdwatchers mainly during the winter season. Interpretation centre explaining the importance of the wetland and waterfowl of this sanctuary was established and opened for public in 2015.

References

External links
 http://ibcn.in/wp-content/uploads/2015/05/Tamil-Nadu.pdf
 https://www.forests.tn.gov.in/pages/view/karaivetti_bs
 http://tamilnadu-favtourism.blogspot.in/2015/10/karaivetti-bird-sanctuary-ariyalur.html
 https://ebird.org/ebird/hotspot/L1114340

Gallery

Bird sanctuaries of Tamil Nadu
Important Bird Areas of India
Protected areas of Tamil Nadu
1989 establishments in Tamil Nadu
Protected areas established in 1989